The Immanuel Methodist Episcopal Church is a historic church at 1406 West Eastman Street in Boise, Idaho.  It was started in 1910 and was added to the National Register in 1982.

It was designed by Tourtellotte & Hummel and is relatively unusual among their designs for its "Romanesque flavor".  It is described as architecturally mixed: "architecturally significant as an ecclesiastical structure showing an interesting hybridization of traditional, medieval forms (round arches and crenellation) with classical elements (eave returns) and a horizontality and breadth of gable which may be attributed, as may a good deal of the architecture of this period, to the influence of the bungalow and related styles."

References

Methodist churches in Idaho
Churches on the National Register of Historic Places in Idaho
Romanesque Revival church buildings in Idaho
Churches completed in 1910
Churches in Boise, Idaho
1910 establishments in Idaho
National Register of Historic Places in Boise, Idaho
Tourtellotte & Hummel buildings